The Lohr Fardier is a French light general purpose 4x4 vehicle, capable of being transported by air, developed by Lohr Industrie for use by airborne troops.

History 
This light 4x4 vehicle was developed by SOFRAMAG (later Lohr Industrie) for the French Army airborne troops, which used 300 of these. Two versions were produced: FL 500 and FL 501, the latter with a 36 hp engine.

France has replaced its FL 500/501 with the Auverland A3F fast attack vehicle; while it can't be assured whether the vehicles supplied to Spain and Tunisia are still in service.

Description 

It has a chassis built of welded tubes, with the cargo area at the back (formed by aluminium panels), the engine in the middle (transversally positioned) and the driver at the front left (protected by a demountable U-shaped safety bar). Each axle has a transmission unit, with coil-spring suspension. Each rear wheel has an independent parking brake, while brakes in all 4 wheels are with discs. The vehicle has a dual lighting system for full lighting or for reduced "convoy" lighting.

The FL 501 can tow up to 800 kg, a typical cargo is a 120 mm mortar. Other loads include communication equipment, general cargo, or up to 2 stretchers.

It can be air transported either by cargo plane or by helicopter:
 A C-130 Hercules or C-160 Transall can carry up to 6 for air-dropping, or up to 12 as general cargo
 A Puma helicopter can carry a FL 500/501 and a 120 mm mortar.

Specifications 

The engine is a Citroen 602cc flat twin. This is the same unit that powered the militarised Citroen Mehari, which was a development of the Dyane engine. All the running gear is from the Citroen A series "family" except for the steering column which is from the H van. The vacuum carburettor limits the speed to about 35 km/h. There is a differential slip limiter worked by belts and levers.

Users

Current 
 Argentina

Former

See also
Luchtmobiel Speciaal Voertuig — Lohr VLA (Véhicule Légère Aeromobile)

References

Bibliography 
 Jane's Military Vehicles and Logistics 2009

External links 
 Summary History and Description, Jane's website
 Brief description and walk-around images - Brightwheels Classic Cars website (accessed 2018-01-15)

Military light utility vehicles
Military equipment of Argentina
Military vehicles of France
Airborne fighting vehicles